Santi is used as:

People with the surname
 Brenden Santi (born 1993), Australian-Italian rugby league player
 Domenico Santi (1621–1694), also known as il Mengazzino, Italian painter
 Emanuele Santi, Italian economist and political scientist
 Enrico Mario Santí, Cuban-American writer and scholar
 Franco Biondi Santi (1922–2013), Italian winemaker
 Giancarlo Santi (born 1939), Italian director and screenwriter
 Giorgio Santi (1746–1822), Italian scientist
 Giovanni Santi (1435–1494), Italian painter and decorator, father of Raphael
 Guido De Santi (1923–1998), Italian racing cyclist
 Guido Santi, filmmaker, director and producer
 Jacques Santi (1939–1988), French film producer
 Marco de Santi (born 1983), Brazilian professional vert skater
 Nello Santi (1931–2020), "Papa Santi", Italian conductor
 Nicola Delli Santi (1970), Italian equestrian
 Pietro Santi Bartoli (1615–1700), Italian engraver, draughtsman and painter
 Sebastiano Santi (1788–1866), Italian painter
 Simone Santi (born 1966), Italian volleyball referee
 Tom Santi (born 1985), American football tight end

People with the given name
 Santi Aldama (born 2001), Spanish professional basketball player
 Santi Buglioni (1494–1576), Italian sculptor
 Santi Cazorla (born 1984), Spanish footballer
 Santi Chaiyaphuak (born 1978), Thai footballer
 Santi Debriano (born 1955), jazz bassist
 Santi Freixa (born 1983), Spanish field hockey player
 Santi Gucci (died 1600), Polish-Italian architect and sculptor
 Santi Kolk (born 1981), Dutch footballer
 Santi Leksukhum (born 1945), Thai art historian and archaeologist
 Santi Prunati (c. 1650–1728), Italian painter
 Santi Quasimodo (1887–1945), Italian Blackshirt general
 Santi Santamaria (1957–2011), Catalan and Spanish chef
 Santi Thakral (1942–2011), member of the Privy Council of King Bhumibol Adulyadej of Thailand
 Santi Thamasucharit  (born 1951), Thai sailor
 Santi White (born 1976), musician, known professionally as Santigold
 Santi Wibowo (born 1974), Swiss badminton player

Other uses
 Santi (album), a 2007 album by "The Academy Is..."
 Santi, Burkina Faso, a village in Burkina Faso

See also
 Grand-Santi, a commune of French Guiana
 Santi Apostoli, Rome, a 6th-century Roman Catholic parish and titular church and minor basilica in Rome
 Santi Asoke, a sect of Theravada Buddhism
 Santi Suk District, a district (Amphoe) in the central part of Nan Province, northern Thailand
 Shanti (disambiguation)
 Three-body problem (disambiguation), known as San Ti in Chinese